Helmut Noll (27 June 1934 – 27 November 2018) was a German rower who competed in the 1952 Summer Olympics.  In 1952, he was the coxswain of the German boat which won the silver medal in the coxed pairs event.

References

1934 births
2018 deaths
Coxswains (rowing)
Olympic rowers of West Germany
Rowers at the 1952 Summer Olympics
Olympic silver medalists for Germany
Olympic medalists in rowing
German male rowers
Medalists at the 1952 Summer Olympics